The Story of a Boy Who Wanted to Be Kissed is a 1994 French romantic drama film directed by Philippe Harel starring Julien Collet and Marion Cotillard in her film debut.

Plot
Raoul is a 20-year-old student in Paris, but girls are not interested in him, although he is good-looking. Raoul is not looking for a great passion, he only wants to be kissed.

Cast
Julien Collet as Raoul
Marion Cotillard as Mathilde
Hélène Médigue as Isabelle
Marie Pailhes as Virginie
Sébastien Tavel as Jean-Denis
Jean Lescot as	Raoul's father
Marie-Claude Mestral as Raoul's mother
Marie-Christine Laurent as Cathy
Philippe Morier-Genoud as Mr. Clarke

References

External links 
 
 

1994 films
1994 romantic drama films
French romantic drama films
1990s French-language films
Films set in France
Films shot in France
Films shot in Paris
Films set in Paris
1990s French films